Earthbound is the 1997 debut album by Conner Reeves.  Three singles came from the album, "My Father's Son", "Earthbound" and "Read My Mind". It entered the UK Albums Chart on 6 December 1997, reaching number 25 and staying in the charts for 11 weeks.

Critical reception 

Andy Gill of The Independent wrote on 28 November 1997:

Track listing

Personnel
Conner Reeves -  lead vocals
 Grant Mitchell - keyboards
 Adam Drake - guitar
 Dominic Miller - guitar
 Keeling Lee - guitar
 Graham Lyle - guitar
 Pino Palladino - bass guitar
 Manu Katché - drums
 Ren Swan - percussion
 Henry Jackson - drum programming
 London Session Orchestra conducted by James Shearman.

Notes

1997 debut albums
Conner Reeves albums